Leonard John Keys (3 August 1880 – 1958) was a New Zealand lawn bowls player who competed for his country at the 1934 British Empire Games. However, he is more notable as a businessman and one of the pioneers of passenger bus services in Auckland.

Early life and family
Born in Patea on 3 August 1880, Keys was the son of Harriet Jane Keys (née Watson) and John Edward Keys. He grew up in the Thames area, before serving an apprenticeship as a grocer in Auckland. In 1903, he married Sarah Margery McMaster, and the couple went on to have three children.

Lawn bowls
Keys was a member of the Auckland Bowling Club team that won the men's fours title at the 1932 national lawn bowls championships, held in Christchurch. He went on to represent New Zealand in the men's singles at the 1934 British Empire Games in London. He lost all nine of his round-robin matches, finishing in tenth, and last, place.

Business activities

Keys ran a grocery business in the Auckland suburb of Remuera, on the corner of Remuera and Clonbern Roads, between 1907 and 1914. The following year, he established a passenger bus service running between Remuera and Saint Heliers, and in 1923 began a service with three buses from Saint Heliers into central Auckland. In 1925, ferry services from Saint Heliers to the city ceased operation, and Keys expanded his bus service on the route. By 1949, when his business was taken over by the Auckland Transport Board, Keys had a fleet of about 40 buses.

Keys served as a member of the Tamaki West Road Board for nine years, and was a member of the Auckland Chamber of Commerce and the Omnibus Proprietors' Association.

Death
Keys died on 26 January 1958, and his ashes were buried at Purewa Cemetery. His wife, Margery, died in 1969.

Honorific eponym
Keys Terrace in the Auckland suburb of Saint Heliers is named in Keys' honour.

References

External links
 Photograph of Len Keys and other members of the New Zealand lawn bowls team at the 1934 British Empire Games in London, Northern Advocate, 14 September 1934, p. 10

1880 births
1958 deaths
People from Patea
New Zealand male bowls players
Bowls players at the 1934 British Empire Games
Local politicians in New Zealand
20th-century New Zealand businesspeople
Burials at Purewa Cemetery
Commonwealth Games competitors for New Zealand
19th-century New Zealand people
20th-century New Zealand people